Kelyn Jaynes Rowe (born December 2, 1991) is an American professional soccer player who plays as a midfielder for Major League Soccer club Seattle Sounders FC.

Career

College and amateur
Rowe appeared as an attacking midfielder for the UCLA Bruins, and was a standout player during his freshman year in 2010, ranking second in the Pac-10 Conference in assists with ten and winning the Pac-10 Freshman of the Year award.

Rowe started 21 games for the Bruins in his freshman year in 2010, scoring seven goals and adding ten assists. As well as winning the Pac-10 Freshman of the Year award, Rowe was also selected to the All-Pac-10 First-team and Third-team All-American, while leading the Bruins to the Louisville, Kentucky Regional Game in the 2010 NCAA Men's Division I Soccer Tournament.

Rowe took the spring quarter off at UCLA to train and play with the U.S. U-20 national team full-time. In 2011, Rowe spent the summer on trial with the German Bundesliga club 1. FC Köln before returning to UCLA for his sophomore season.

During Rowe's sophomore campaign he scored six goals and tallied 10 assists during UCLA's run to the semifinals of the NCAA College Cup.

Professional
Rowe was drafted 3rd overall in the 2012 MLS SuperDraft, by the New England Revolution.  He was listed in January 2012 by ESPN as one of the top 10 American players under 21. He is known for his ball skills and passing ability. He scored his first goal in the 2012 campaign for the New England Revolution in a surprising win over defending MLS Champions the Los Angeles Galaxy 3–1 on the road.

Rowe won MLS Player of the Week honors for his two-goal performance in a 5–1 win over the Philadelphia Union in Week 25 of the 2013 Season.

In June 2018, The Revolution were approached by an unnamed Israeli Premier League club regarding a potential transfer for Rowe, however no deal was made as terms could not be agreed upon by the teams.

On December 18, 2018, Rowe was traded to Colorado Rapids in exchange for Edgar Castillo, then was immediately traded to Sporting Kansas City in exchange for Diego Rubio, $200,000 of General Allocation Money and $100,000 of Targeted Allocation Money.

Rowe was further traded to Real Salt Lake on August 7, 2019.

Rowe was signed as a free agent by the New England Revolution on December 4, 2019.

Rowe was traded to the Seattle Sounders on January 12, 2021. He scored his first goal for the club on July 7 against the Houston Dynamo.

International
Rowe played for the U.S. U-18 national team, and the U.S. U-20 national team, starting in all three games, scoring three goals and assisting on one in the 2011 CONCACAF U-20 Championship tournament, while wearing the number 10 jersey.

Rowe was added to the December U-23 Men's National Team training camp roster in 2012.

Rowe was named to the senior national team squad for the 2017 CONCACAF Gold Cup. He made his debut in a friendly match against Ghana on July 1, 2017, and scored his first goal in a group stage match against Nicaragua on July 15, 2017.

Career statistics

International goals
Scores and results list the United States's goal tally first.

|-
|1. ||July 15, 2017||FirstEnergy Stadium, Cleveland, United States||||align=center|2–0||align=center|3–0||2017 CONCACAF Gold Cup
|}

Honors
Seattle Sounders FC
CONCACAF Champions League: 2022

Individual
Pac-12 Conference Player of the Year: 2011
Pac-12 Conference Freshman Player of the Year: 2010
Pac-12 Conference First-team: 2010, 2011
NSCAA Far West Region First-team: 2010
NCAA All-American Third-team: 2010

References

External links
 
 U.S. soccer profile
 UCLA Bio
 Pac-12 2011 Men's Soccer Awards

1991 births
Living people
People from Federal Way, Washington
Soccer players from Washington (state)
Sportspeople from King County, Washington
American soccer players
Association football midfielders
UCLA Bruins men's soccer players
USL League Two players
Major League Soccer players
USL Championship players
Washington Crossfire players
New England Revolution players
Sporting Kansas City players
Sporting Kansas City II players
Real Salt Lake players
Real Monarchs players
Seattle Sounders FC players
New England Revolution draft picks
United States men's youth international soccer players
United States men's under-20 international soccer players
United States men's international soccer players
2017 CONCACAF Gold Cup players
CONCACAF Gold Cup-winning players